Abbasabad-e Muqufeh (also Romanized as Abbāsābād-e Mūqūfeh; also known as ‘Abbāsābād) is a village in Enaj Rural District, Qareh Chay District, Khondab County, Markazi Province, Iran. At the 2006 census, its population was 590, in 169 families.

References 

Populated places in Khondab County